John Hancock Hay Jr. (October 2, 1917 – December 18, 1995) was a lieutenant general in the United States Army who served as commander of the Berlin Brigade, the 1st Infantry Division during the Vietnam War and XVIII Airborne Corps.

Background
Hay was born in Thief River Falls, Minnesota.

Military career

World War II
Hay served with the 10th Mountain Division in Italy during World War II. He reached the rank of major, and was awarded the Silver Star and Legion of Merit

Interbellum
Hay served as commander of the 1st Airborne Battle Group, 327th Infantry Regiment from September 1959 to July 1960 and later as chief of staff of the 101st Airborne Division until 1961. In 1962 he served with the Eighth United States Army in South Korea. Hay then commanded the Berlin Brigade from 1964 to 1966.

Vietnam War
Hay was assigned to South Vietnam in January 1967 as commanding general of the 1st Infantry Division and remained in this role until February 1968.

Hay subsequently was promoted to deputy commander of II Field Force, Vietnam and became commander of Capital Military Assistance Command at Camp Lê Văn Duyệt, Saigon and led the defense of Saigon during the May Offensive. He remained in this role until his departure from South Vietnam in August 1968. For his service in Vietnam, and command of the 1st Infantry Division, Hay was awarded the Distinguished Service Cross and Army Distinguished Service Medal.

Post-Vietnam
Hay served as commandant of the Command and General Staff College until the end of February 1971, and then commanded, as lieutenant general, the XVIII Airborne Corps from 1 March 1971 until his retirement in May 1973.

References

External links

1917 births
1995 deaths
People from Thief River Falls, Minnesota
Military personnel from Minnesota
United States Army personnel of the Vietnam War
United States Army personnel of World War II
Recipients of the Distinguished Flying Cross (United States)
Recipients of the Distinguished Service Cross (United States)
Recipients of the Distinguished Service Medal (US Army)
Recipients of the Legion of Merit
Recipients of the Silver Star
United States Army generals